Tampines Central is a district of Tampines in Singapore.

Housing
Tampines Central, consists of several blocks:

 Blocks 7XX
 Tampines Sunrise - Blocks 701A, 701-711
 Tampines Starlight - Blocks 712-723, 716A, 723A
 Tampines Courtview - Blocks 724-734, 727A, 730A
 Tampines Greenville - Blocks 735-742, 742A
Blocks 8XX
Tampines Greenwood - Blocks 868A-D, 869A-C
Tampines Palmwalk - Blocks 830 - 841
Tampines Ville - Blocks 842 - 856
Tampines Arcadia - Blocks 842A - 842H, 856A - 856F
Tampines Parkview - Blocks 857A/B - 864A/B
Tampines Vista - Blocks 865 - 874, 867A, 871A, 874A
Tampines Spring - Blocks 875 - 880A, 881-885A, 882A, 886A

Amenities
There is the Tampines Central CC, Our Tampines Hub (which was opened in November 2016), the Tampines Central Park and the Darul Ghufran Mosque.

Transportation
Residents can take selected bus services to Tampines Central including service 3, 10, 20, 23, 27, 31, 34, 34A, 34B, 39, 46, 65, 67, 69, 72, 118, 118A, 127, 127A, 129, 168, 291, 292, 293, 298 and 513.

Education
There are several primary and secondary schools in Tampines Central. These include - primary schools (St Hilda's and Poi Ching), secondary schools (St Hilda's and Junyuan).

References

Tampines